Observation Peak is a  mountain summit located in Banff National Park, Alberta, Canada. The mountain can be seen from the Icefields Parkway near the Bow Summit.

The peak was named in 1898 by Charles L. Noyes, a Boston clergyman, who upon climbing to the top found it to have the best viewpoint he had ever reached.

The mountain can be scrambled using the western slopes and after reaching the top of the false summit, a 20-minute plod to the northwest leads to the true summit about  higher.

Geology

Like other mountains in Banff Park, the mountain is composed of sedimentary rock laid down during the Precambrian to Jurassic periods. Formed in shallow seas, this sedimentary rock was pushed east and over the top of younger rock during the Laramide orogeny.

Climate

Based on the Köppen climate classification, Observation Peak is located in a subarctic climate with cold, snowy winters, and mild summers.

References

See also
List of mountains of Canada
Geography of Alberta

External links
 Parks Canada web site: Banff National Park

Three-thousanders of Alberta
Mountains of Banff National Park